The 2016 Stockton ATP Challenger was a professional tennis tournament played on hard courts. It was the first edition of the tournament which was part of the 2016 ATP Challenger Tour. It took place in Stockton, California, United States between 1 October and 9 October 2016.

Singles main-draw entrants

Seeds

 1 Rankings are as of September 26, 2016.

Other entrants
The following players received wildcards into the singles main draw:
  José Chamba Gómez
  Nicolas Meister
  Brian Baker
  Sem Verbeek

The following players received entry using a special exempt into the singles main draw:
  Mackenzie McDonald
  Michael Mmoh

The following players received entry from the qualifying draw:
  Brydan Klein
  Salvatore Caruso
  Dennis Nevolo
  Frederik Nielsen

Champions

Singles

 Frances Tiafoe def.   Noah Rubin, 6–4, 6–2.

Doubles

 Brian Baker /  Sam Groth def.  Matt Reid /  John-Patrick Smith, 6–2, 4–6, [10–2].

References

Stockton ATP Challenger
Tennis tournaments in California
Sports competitions in Stockton, California
2016 in sports in California